Bahu or Bahuka was a king of the Ikshvaku dynasty or the Suryavamsha (solar dynasty). According to the Puranas, he was son of Vrika. But the Ramayana mentions him as Asita, son of Bharata. According to this text, he had two queens, one of them was Kalindi. He was vanquished and driven out of his country by the tribes of Haihayas and Talajanghas and took refuge in the forest near the hermitage of Agni, a descendant of Urva. His son, Gurgaon 
Sagara was born in this hermitage.

Notes

References
Dowson's Classical Dictionary of Hindu Mythology

Characters in Hindu mythology